Love on the Dole is a 1933 novel by Walter Greenwood, adapted into a play by Ronald Gow.

Love on the Dole may also refer to:

Love on the Dole (film), a 1941 film adaptation starring Deborah Kerr and Clifford Evans
"Love on the Dole", a song by The Libertines from Anthems for Doomed Youth